is a town located in Kasuya District, Fukuoka Prefecture, Japan.

As of April 30, 2017, the town has an estimated population of 46,709 and a density of 3,300 persons per km². The total area is 14.12 km².

The district is served by the Kashii Line and the Sasaguri Line.

References

External links

Kasuya official website 

Towns in Fukuoka Prefecture